Tellurous acid is an inorganic compound with the formula H2TeO3.  It is the oxoacid of tellurium(IV).  This compound is not well characterized.  An alternative way of writing its formula is (HO)2TeO. In principle, tellurous acid would form by treatment of tellurium dioxide with water, that is by hydrolysis.  The related conjugate base is well known in the form of several salts such as potassium hydrogen tellurite, KHTeO3.

Properties
In contrast to the analogous compound selenous acid, tellurous acid is only metastable. Most tellurite salts contain the  ion. Oxidation of its aqueous solution with hydrogen peroxide gives the tellurate ion. It is usually prepared as an aqueous solution where it acts as a weak acid.

H2TeO3 + H2O  H3O+ + Ka1 = 
 + H2O  H3O+ + Ka2 =

References

Hydrogen compounds
Tellurites
Oxoacids